John Poad Drake (1794–1883) was an inventor and artist from Stoke Damerel, in present-day Devon. He worked at the Plymouth Dockyard. He later painted in Halifax, Nova Scotia (1815), Montreal and New York. He later returned to England and patented a new system for drilling screws at the shipyard.  He is a descendant of Sir Francis Drake.  Drake was a student of the Royal Academy in London.  Drake's painting of the Last Supper hangs in the new Christ Church Cathedral, on St. Catherine Street, Montreal (1825).

Gallery

Links 
 Shippling at Low Tide, Halifax, Art Gallery of Nova Scotia
Montreal from St. Helen's Island, Royal Ontario Museum
  Montreal
 Quebec

References 

Text
 
Mechanic's Magazine, lxvii.242, 251–4, 393, 422, 493–5, 538, lxviii. 107, 181, 228, 542, 609, lxix. 61; 
Artisan, May 1852, March 1854; 
Civil Engineer and Architect's Journal, xv. 113
  Boase and Courtney's Bibliotheca Cornubiensis: Comprising a supplementary catalogue of authors .... p. 1160
 “John Poad Drake (1794-1883): the First Artist to Portray the Hospital”, Montreal General Hospital News 1981, 19(l): 8-9.

1794 births
1883 deaths